Bezenchuksky District is an administrative and municipal district (raion), one of the twenty-seven in Samara Oblast, Russia. It is located in the west of the oblast. Its administrative center is the urban locality (an urban-type settlement) of Bezenchuk. Population: 42,095 (2010 Census);  The population of Bezenchuk accounts for 54.5% of the district's total population.

References

Notes

Sources

Districts of Samara Oblast